"I Cross My Heart" is a song written by Steve Dorff and Eric Kaz, and performed by American country music artist George Strait. It was released in September 1992 as the first single to his album Pure Country, which is also the soundtrack to the movie of the same title. It reached number-one in both the United States and Canada. The song is featured as the movie's finale.

Music video
The music video was directed by Charley Randazzo, and consists entirely of scenes from the film, Strait's next music video "Heartland" also exclusively used scenes from Pure Country. These two videos were released consecutively as were the singles.

Critical reception
"I Cross My Heart" is widely regarded as one of Strait's best songs. Billboard and American Songwriter ranked the song number five and number four, respectively, on their lists of the 10 greatest George Strait songs.

Chart positions
"I Cross My Heart" debuted at number 58 on the U.S. Billboard Hot Country Singles & Tracks for the week of October 3, 1992 and peaked at number one on December 5, 1992.  Since it became available for digital download, the song has sold 992,000 digital copies in the United States as of January 2015.

Year-end charts

Certifications

References

1992 singles
Country ballads
George Strait songs
Song recordings produced by Tony Brown (record producer)
Songs written by Steve Dorff
Songs written by Eric Kaz
MCA Nashville Records singles
1992 songs